Outrigger Pandanas is the second-tallest building in Darwin. It is at 43 Knuckey Street, in the eastern side of the Darwin central business district. It comprises 29 levels of mixed use for residential and commercial.

The building is currently managed by the Saville Hotel Group which manages more than 150 resorts, hotels and apartments across Australia and New Zealand.

References

External links
Gwelo Investments Pty Ltd
Pandanas homepage
Pandanas info sheet

Buildings and structures in Darwin, Northern Territory
Skyscrapers in Darwin, Northern Territory
Skyscraper office buildings in Australia
Residential skyscrapers in Australia